Brussels-South railway station (IATA code: ZYR), officially Brussels-South, is a major railway station in Brussels, Belgium. Geographically, it is located in Saint-Gilles/Sint-Gillis on the border with the adjacent municipality of Anderlecht and just south of the City of Brussels.

Brussels-South is one of over a dozen railway stations in Brussels, and one of the three principal rail stations in the heart of the city, the two others being Brussels-Central and Brussels-North. The station, which was a terminus when it was inaugurated in 1869, became a transit station with the opening of the North–South connection in 1952. Nowadays, it is the busiest station in Belgium, and is the only Brussels stop for international high-speed rail services: Eurostar, Thalys and ICE.

Underneath Brussels-South is the rapid transit / station on lines 2, 3, 4 and 6 of the Brussels Metro and premetro (underground tram) systems, which serves as an important node of the Brussels Intercommunal Transport Company (STIB/MIVB).

Naming
The station was named after Le Midi, the French name of the region of Southern France, as trains departing from this station in the 19th century had that region as their final destination.

The Brussels-Capital Region is bilingual; hence, both the French and Dutch names of the station— and —are official. Outside Belgium, this often leads to the use of combined shorthands; for example in the Thomas Cook European Rail Timetable, Brussels-South is designated as  /; NS (Dutch Railways) announce the station as Brussel Zuid/Midi.

History

First station (1839–1869)

A first station known as Bogards' railway station had existed, since 1839, near the Place Rouppe/Rouppeplein in the southern part of the City of Brussels, so-called for the former cloister of the Bogards' convent whose site it was built on, and to which the / is nowadays the only reference. This station, which quickly took the name "South Station", served as the six-track terminus of the South Line, a southbound railway line linking Brussels to the industrial towns of Mons, Charleroi and La Louvière, at the heart of the Sillon industriel in Hainaut, Belgium, before crossing the French border (near Quiévrain), where a connecting line could reach Valenciennes, in northern France. The former presence of a station at this location also explains the unusual width of the current /, which goes up from the Place Rouppe to the Small Ring (Brussels' inner ring road), a reminder of the train tracks that used to run in its middle.

Second station (1869–1949)
The Belgian railway network grew rapidly during the second half of the 19th century, becoming the densest in continental Europe. By then, Brussels-North and Brussels-South had become the primary railway stations in Brussels (Brussels-North slowly supplanted the original / railway station near the same site). However, they were joined only by an inadequate single track running along what is today the Small Ring. Many proposals were put forward to link the two stations more substantially. A law was finally passed in 1909 mandating a direct connection; however, the final project would not be completed until nearly half a century later.

Around 1860, the South Station had reached saturation point and its location too close to the city centre began to cause problems, so the authorities decided to demolish it. A new monumental station, designed by the architect Auguste Payen in neoclassical style, opened in 1869, a short distance south from the original site, on the territory of the municipality of Saint-Gilles/Sint-Gillis. The entrance was shaped like a triumphal arch, richly decorated with sculptures by Joseph Ducaju. In 1880, an allegorical statue of Nike, the Greek goddess of victory riding a chariot, by the sculptor Louis Samain, was placed on the roof of the station as a tribute to railway engineering. In front of the station, a large public square, known as the / ("Constitution Square"), was created, acting as an entry to the city for its many commuters.

Current station (1949–present)
Payen's terminal station was itself demolished in 1949, as part of the North–South connection project, and replaced by a transit station on its present site along the Avenue Fonsny/Fonsnylaan. Most of the current buildings were erected between 1939 and 1954, in post-war functionalist style, from plans by architects Adrien and Yvan Blomme and Fernand Petit. Work on the connection also led to the station's immediate surroundings to be reorganised. The railway tracks were raised  and extended unto a viaduct towards the city centre, with shops under it and a covered street; the / (formerly the /), along which trams run.

Since the 1990s, the South Station and the district adjacent to it have undergone profound transformation. The rear part of the station, designed in 1992 by the architect Marc De Vreese, and built in front of the /, serves as a terminal for high-speed trains. On Saint-Gilles' side, expropriation plans have led, since 2012, to the creation of modern office blocks constituting a tertiary economic sector along the Avenue Fonsny, as well as extensions of the station along the /, the two arteries that surround the station. This business centre located a stone's throw from the city centre, is intended, in the spirit of the public authorities, to mirror the Northern Quarter business district (also called Little Manhattan), located near the North Station, on the opposite side of the city centre.

Features

The station is surrounded by the Avenue Fonsny/Fonsnylaan to the east, the / to the west, the / to the north and the / to the south. In the 1990s, the Eurostar terminal was added on the Rue de France's side. This part contains two bay platforms with no onward northbound connection.

A tripartite agreement was signed by Belgium, France and the UK on 15 May 1993, which permitted British officials to carry out pre-embarkation immigration controls for passengers travelling on direct Eurostar train services from Brussels to London and Belgian officials to carry out pre-embarkation immigration controls at London Waterloo International (and subsequently St Pancras International) station for passengers travelling in the other direction. As a result of this agreement, juxtaposed controls were set up in the station. On 1 October 2004, an administrative arrangement was signed by Belgium, France and the UK to extend juxtaposed controls to Eurostar services between London and Brussels which make a stop in Lille.

Eurostar passengers travelling to the UK clear exit checks from the Schengen Area (carried out by the Belgian Federal Police) as well as UK entry checks (conducted by the UK Border Force) in the station before boarding their train. On the other hand, Eurostar passengers travelling to Lille Europe or Calais-Fréthun remain within the Schengen Area and are therefore not subject to border checks. Accordingly, they go through a different departure area in the station (bypassing the juxtaposed controls for passengers heading to the UK) and travel in a separate designated coach (available in standard class only) controlled by security guards, who ensure that all of these passengers disembark at Lille/Calais before the train continues to the UK.

Train services
The station is served by the following services:

High speed services (Eurostar) London - Lille - Brussels
High speed services (Eurostar) London - Brussels - Rotterdam - Amsterdam
High speed services (Intercity Express) Brussels - Liège - Cologne - Frankfurt
High speed services (Thalys) Amsterdam - Rotterdam - Antwerp - Brussels - Paris
High speed services (Thalys) Dortmund - Essen - Düsseldorf - Cologne - Liège - Brussels - Paris
High speed services (Thalys) Amsterdam - Rotterdam - Antwerp - Brussels - Lille
High speed services (Thalys) Amsterdam - Rotterdam - Antwerp - Brussels - Chambéry - Bourg-Saint-Maurice (in winter)
High speed services (Thalys) Amsterdam - Rotterdam - Antwerp - Brussels - Avignon - Marseille (in summer)
High speed services (TGV) Brussels - Lille - Aéroport CDG - Lyon - Avignon - Marseille
High speed services (TGV) Brussels - Lille - Aéroport CDG - Lyon - Nîmes - Montpellier - Perpignan
High speed services (TGV) Brussels - Lille - Aéroport CDG - Strasbourg
High speed services (ICD-35) Amsterdam - Rotterdam - Breda - Antwerp - Brussels Airport - Brussels
Intercity services (IC-01) Ostend - Bruges - Ghent - Brussels - Leuven - Liège - Welkenraedt - Eupen
Intercity services (IC-03) Blankenberge - Bruges - Ghent - Brussels - Leuven - Hasselt - Genk
Intercity services (IC-16) Brussels - Namur - Arlon - Luxembourg
Intercity services (IC-05) Essen - Antwerp - Mechelen - Brussels - Nivelles - Charleroi (weekdays)
Intercity services (IC-06) Tournai - Ath - Halle - Brussels - Brussels Airport
Intercity services (IC-06A) Mons - Braine-le-Comte - Brussels - Brussels Airport
Intercity services (IC-07) Charleroi - Nivelles - Brussels - Antwerp (weekdays)
Intercity services (IC-11) Binche - Braine-le-Comte - Halle - Brussels - Mechelen - Turnhout (weekdays)
Intercity services (IC-11) Binche - Braine-le-Comte - Halle - Brussels - Scharbeek (weekends)
Intercity services (IC-12) Kortrijk - Ghent - Brussels - Leuven - Liège - Welkenraedt (weekdays)
Intercity services (IC-13) Kortrijk - Denderleeuw - Brussels - Schaarbeek (weekdays)
Intercity services (IC-14) Quiévrain - Mons - Braine-le-Comte - Brussels - Leuven - Liège (weekdays)
Intercity services (IC-16/34) Brussels - Namur - Arlon - Luxembourg
Intercity services (IC-17) Brussels - Namur - Dinant (weekends)
Intercity services (IC-18) Brussels - Namur - Liège (weekdays)
Intercity services (IC-20) Ghent - Aalst - Brussels - Hasselt - Tongeren (weekdays)
Intercity services (IC-20) Ghent - Aalst - Brussels - Dendermonde - Lokeren (weekends)
Intercity services (IC-22) Antwerp - Mechelen - Brussels
Intercity services (IC-23) Ostend - Bruges - Kortrijk - Zottegem - Brussels - Brussels Airport
Intercity services (IC-23A) Knokke - Bruges - Ghent - Brussels - Brussels Airport
Intercity services (IC-26) Kortrijk - Tournai - Halle - Brussels - Dendermonde - Lokeren - Sint Niklaas (weekdays)
Intercity services (IC-29) Gent - Aalst - Brussels - Brussels Airport - Leuven - Landen (weekdays)
Intercity services (IC-29) De Panne - Gent - Aalst - Brussels - Brussels Airport - Leuven - Landen (weekends)
Intercity services (IC-31) Antwerp - Mechelen - Brussels (weekdays)
Intercity services (IC-31) Antwerp - Mechelen - Brussels - Nivelles - Charleroi (weekends)
Brussels RER services (S1) Antwerp - Mechelen - Brussels - Waterloo - Nivelles (weekdays)
Brussels RER services (S1) Antwerp - Mechelen - Brussels (weekends)
Brussels RER services (S1) Brussels - Waterloo - Nivelles (weekends)
Brussels RER services (S2) Leuven - Brussels - Halle - Braine-le-Comte
Brussels RER services (S3) Dendermonde - Brussels - Denderleeuw - Zottegem (weekdays)
Brussels RER services (S3) Schaarbeek - Brussels - Denderleeuw - Zottegem (weekends)
Brussels RER services (S6) Aalst - Denderleeuw - Geraardsbergen - Halle - Brussels - Schaarbeek (weekdays)
Brussels RER services (S6) Denderleeuw - Geraardsbergen - Halle - Brussels - Schaarbeek (weekends)
Brussels RER services (S8) Brussels - Etterbeek - Ottignies - Louvain-le-Neuve
Brussels RER services (S10) Dendermonde - Brussels - Denderleeuw - Aalst

Metro and premetro station

The metro station, called /, opened on 2 October 1988 as (at that time) the terminus of metro line 2 from Simonis. Line 2 has since been extended beyond Brussels-South to Clemenceau in 1993, Delacroix in 2006, and Gare de l'Ouest/Weststation in 2009. Since 1993, the station also accommodates premetro (underground tram) services at separate platforms, with cross-platform interchange between metro and premetro in both directions.

Connections

International buses
Since 23 July 2012, SNCF's international coach network, OUIBUS (taken over by BlaBlaBus in 2018), has served Brussels-South.
 Paris - Lille - Brussels
 Amsterdam - Brussels (from 28 April 2014)
 Amsterdam - Brussels - London (from 28 April 2014)

Other bus services
A shuttle service to Brussels South Charleroi Airport leaves from a stop located on the /.

Places of interest
The South Tower, the tallest building in Belgium, stands in front of the station's main exit (the crossroad of the Avenue Fonsny/Fonsnylaan and the /) and houses the Belgian Federal Pensions Service (FPS).

See also
 List of railway stations in Belgium
 List of TGV stations
 Rail transport in Belgium
 Transport in Brussels
 History of Brussels

References

Notes

Bibliography

External links

 Bruxelles-Midi/Brussel-Zuid page at b-europe.com

Railway stations in Brussels
Railway stations served by Eurostar
Brussels metro stations
Railway stations opened in 1869
1869 establishments in Belgium
Saint-Gilles, Belgium
Juxtaposed border controls
Railway stations opened in 1952